The 1962 Western Kentucky Hilltoppers football team represented Western Kentucky State College (now known as Western Kentucky University) as a member of the Ohio Valley Conference (OVC) during the 1962 NCAA College Division football season. Led by sixth-year head coach Nick Denes, the Hilltoppers compiled an overall record of 5–3 with a mark of 3–3 in conference play, plaching fifth place in the OVC. The team's captain was Lee Murray.

Schedule

References

Western Kentucky
Western Kentucky Hilltoppers football seasons
Western Kentucky Hilltoppers football